Glenea mouhoti is a species of beetle in the family Cerambycidae. It was described by James Thomson in 1865. It is known from Laos, China, Vietnam, Cambodia, and Thailand. It feeds on Tectona grandis and Gmelina arborea.

Subspecies
Glenea mouhoti var. albodiversa.

References

mouhoti
Beetles described in 1865